The Panasonic AG-DVX100 was released in October 2002. Its 60Hz version was the first consumer-affordable digital camcorder capable of recording video at 24 progressive frames per second.

The last revision was the DVX100B(E) (2005). The camera records to tape, but third party developers have modified DVX100 cameras to dump raw images to a tethered laptop. However, the company most known for doing this, Reel Stream, is no longer operational.

For the Chinese market, the series was badged as "AG-DVC180/A/B". They are otherwise identical to the European PAL AG-DVC180E.

Technical specs
Panasonic created a complete line of cameras that support recording in 24p, which is an analog of how film cameras record frames, for independent film production. 24p is commonly used in motion picture production and progressive scan, which avoids interlacing to give artefact free frames. These features give the recordings a film quality appearance.

The original AG-DVX100 can only shoot in a 4:3 aspect ratio. The "A" revision added a capability to shoot widescreen video, but this appeared squashed on the built-in monitor. The "B" revision introduced the ability to properly monitor 16:9 aspect ratio. All revisions have CCD sensors with native aspect ratio of 4:3, which causes the decrease of vertical resolution in widescreen mode because of cropping.

In its segment, the DVX100 was rivalled only by the larger shoulder-mount Canon XL-2 which also records progressive video.

The DVX100 contains a 3-CCD image sensor system, with 410,000 (380,000 effective) pixels each with 4:3 native aspect ratio. When shooting widescreen, the sensor is cropped at the top and at the bottom, resulting in significant loss of resolution. Conversely, the Canon XL-2 has native resolution of roughly 680,000 pixels, which is cropped to 460,000 pixels in widescreen mode and to 350,000 pixels in 4:3 mode.

The DVX100 can record 24p video in "telecined" fashion (2-3 pulldown for 24P and 2-3-3-2 pulldown for 24PA), 30p video in PsF fashion (25p in PAL version), and 60i standard (50i PAL) interlaced video onto MiniDV tape. The camera incorporates "CineGamma" functionality to approximate the characteristic curve of film.  

The DVX100 also features two XLR audio inputs, another rare feature for cameras in its price range, a 4-pin FireWire port, as well as S-Video and RCA in and out ports. It features manual and servo zoom, with a second zoom control and record button on top of the handle for recording from low angles.

Typical camera accessories are: spare batteries, lens adapters, matte boxes, optical filters, tripods, geared and fluid heads for smooth panning and tilting, follow focus systems, external microphone(s), and storage cases.

Films and Shows shot with Panasonic AG-DVX100

Many documentaries, independent shorts, and feature movies have been shot with the Panasonic AG-DVX100, including the Sundance Film Festival-winning feature November, The Puffy Chair by the Duplass Brothers, and the Oscar-nominated documentary Murderball.  The documentary "Iraq in Fragments" was also shot with this camera over a two-year period in Iraq. Seasons 1-5 of the popular TV show It's Always Sunny In Philadelphia were also shot with the DVX100. The Man From Earth was shot from only two DVX100 cameras. 

The Ghost Adventures documentary film, which won the Grand Jury Prize for Best Documentary Feature from the New York International Independent Film and Video Festival in 2006, was also filmed using the Panasonic AG-DVX100A fitted with on-board lights.

References

AG-DVX100
Cameras introduced in 2002